Franklin is an unincorporated community located in the town of Franklin, Jackson County, Wisconsin, United States.

References

Unincorporated communities in Jackson County, Wisconsin
Unincorporated communities in Wisconsin